Israel Schorr (1886 - April 9, 1935) was a prominent cantor during the Golden Age of Hazzanut. Born in Khyriv, the Polish region of Galicia then part of the Austro-Hungarian Empire to a Hasidic family, Schorr began his career as a boy, singing soprano in the courts of various Hasidic masters, notably the Rebbe (Grand Rabbi) of Rymanow. In 1904, Schorr replaced his distant relative Hazzan Boruch Schorr as the official cantor for the rebbe of Rymanów.

During World War I, Schorr served in the Imperial army of the Austro-Hungarian Empire. After the war, he took various cantorial posts in central and eastern Europe, including Brno in Czechoslovakia, Kraków in Poland and a brief stint in Zürich, Switzerland. With help from Congressman Sol Bloom of Chicago, Schorr emigrated to the United States in 1924 on an artist's visa to accept a position in Chicago.  He later served in cantorial positions in New York City. Some of his family still live in New York, and the nearby state of Boston. He also performed frequently, most importantly with the master cantor Yossele Rosenblatt.

Apart from performing the traditional pieces of the Jewish liturgy, Schorr also wrote liturgical pieces. He introduced improvisational lines to the pieces, many of which were later adopted by other prominent cantors. His best-known piece in this style is Sheyibone Beis HaMikdosh, which was modified by Cantor Moshe Koussevitzky.

Schorr died prematurely of a heart condition in 1935.
His son, Morris Schorr, went on to become a cantor in Elizabeth, New Jersey. He was one of the founding members of the Cantor's Assembly.

References 

Hazzans
American people of Polish-Jewish descent
1886 births
1935 deaths
20th-century Polish male singers
People from Lviv Oblast
20th-century American male singers
20th-century American singers